Chris Ryan (born 3 January 1973) is a former professional rugby league footballer who played in the 1990s. He played for the Manly-Warringah Sea Eagles and the Western Reds/Perth Reds in Australia. In the Super League he played for the London Broncos.

Career
He made his first grade debut for Manly-Warringah in round 9 1992 against Canterbury-Bankstown which finished in a 20–20 draw at Brookvale Oval.  Ryan played in Manly's finals campaigns in 1993 and 1994 which both ended in defeat by the Brisbane Broncos.

In 1995, Ryan joined the newly admitted Western Reds franchise.  He played in the club's first ever match which was against St. George which the Western Reds won 28–16 at the WACA Ground.  Ryan finished the 1995 season as the club's top point scorer.  In 1997, the Western Reds joined the rival Super League competition during the Super League war and changed their name to the Perth Reds.  Ryan played in the club's final ever game which came against the Canberra Raiders at the WACA and ended in a 36–16 loss.

After the club was liquidated, Ryan finished his career in the Super League with the London Broncos.

References

External links
NRL points

1973 births
Living people
Australian rugby league players
London Broncos players
Manly Warringah Sea Eagles players
Place of birth missing (living people)
Rugby league centres
Rugby league players from New South Wales
Rugby league wingers
Western Reds players